Michael Wilbon (born ) is an American commentator for ESPN and former sportswriter and columnist for The Washington Post. He is an analyst for ESPN and has co-hosted Pardon the Interruption on ESPN since 2001.

Early life and education
Wilbon was born and raised in Chicago, Illinois. He graduated from St. Ignatius College Preparatory School in 1976 and received his journalism degree in 1980 from Northwestern University's Medill School of Journalism. While in college, Wilbon wrote for The Daily Northwestern.

Career

Newspapers 
Wilbon began working for The Washington Post in 1980 after summer internships at the newspaper in 1979 and 1980. He covered college sports, Major League Baseball, the National Football League and the National Basketball Association before being promoted to full-time columnist in 1990. His column in the Post, which dealt as much with the culture of sports as the action on the court or field, appeared up to four times a week until he left to work full-time for ESPN on December 7, 2010.

In his career, Wilbon  covered ten Summer and Winter Olympic Games for The Washington Post, every Super Bowl since 1987, nearly every Final Four since 1982 and each year's NBA Finals since . Notably, he was also the only reporter based outside of Hawaii to cover the historic basketball upset of top-ranked Virginia by then-NAIA member Chaminade in 1982 (he was in Honolulu to cover a college football bowl game).

During his time at the Post, Wilbon earned the reputation as one of "the best deadline writer[s] in American newspapers." In 2001, Wilbon was named the top sports columnist by the Society of Professional Journalists.

In recent years, Wilbon has become more known as an ESPN personality than as a reporter. On December 7, 2010, he wrote his last column for the Washington Post and officially dedicated full-time to work for ESPN and ABC.

Television 
After contributing to ESPN's The Sports Reporters and other shows on the cable network, Wilbon began co-hosting ESPN's daily opinion forum Pardon the Interruption (PTI) with Tony Kornheiser on October 22, 2001. Wilbon was also a member of ABC's NBA Countdown (which he hosted with Jalen Rose, Bill Simmons and Magic Johnson), which was the pre-game show for the network's NBA telecasts.

In addition to his work at The Washington Post, PTI and ESPN, Wilbon appeared weekly on WRC-TV in Washington, D.C. with WRC Sports Director George Michael, and Pro Football Hall of Famers John Riggins and Sonny Jurgensen on Redskins Report during the football season. He also appeared with Michael, USA Today basketball writer David Dupree and Tony Kornheiser on Full Court Press during the basketball season. Both of these shows were canceled in December 2008 due to budget cuts. Wilbon also forged a close friendship with former Marshall and former NFL quarterback Byron Leftwich while the young passer was a standout player for HD Woodson in Washington, D.C.

In late 2006, Wilbon agreed to a multi-year contract extension with ESPN. After accepting the contract, Wilbon offered to resign from the Post, but the newspaper's chairman Don Graham and executive editor Len Downie both asked him to stay on. The network gained priority therein with regards to conflicts with his newspaper assignments. The first major conflict occurred on February 4, 2007, when Wilbon covered a Detroit Pistons–Cleveland Cavaliers game instead of Super Bowl XLI.

Personal life
Wilbon currently lives in Bethesda, Maryland, and also has a home in Scottsdale, Arizona. Wilbon and his wife Cheryl Johnson Wilbon had their first child, Matthew Raymond Wilbon, via surrogate on March 26, 2008. Kornheiser often refers to Matthew affectionately as "Lilbon."

Wilbon has a cousin, Travon Bellamy, who played for the University of Illinois football team. Former ABC News reporter Carole Simpson is Wilbon's cousin.

Wilbon suffered a heart attack on January 27, 2008. After complaining of chest pains, he was taken to a Scottsdale hospital where doctors performed an angioplasty. Wilbon is also a type-2 diabetic.

On August 10, 2008, during a Cubs–Cardinals game at Wrigley Field, Wilbon threw out the ceremonial first pitch and then sang "Take Me Out to the Ballgame" as part of the seventh-inning stretch. Footage of Wilbon wearing a tucked-in Cubs jersey and bouncing the pitch is frequently shown on Pardon The Interruption as a friendly teasing by Kornheiser.

In May 2009, Wilbon competed in a made-for-TV "King of Bowling" show against pro bowling star Wes Malott. Wilbon beat Malott by a score of 256–248, but Wilbon received a 57-pin handicap and Malott had to use a plastic ball.

Wilbon has served as a trustee of Northwestern University.

White House visit

On July 12, 2013, Wilbon, Kornheiser and Tony Reali (PTI statistician and de facto co-host) were guests at the White House. After lunch the trio met in the Oval Office with President Barack Obama.

References

External links

African-American sports journalists
American sports journalists
African-American writers
American sports radio personalities
American television sports announcers
ESPN people
National Basketball Association broadcasters
National Football League announcers
Medill School of Journalism alumni
St. Ignatius College Prep alumni
The Washington Post people
Writers from Chicago
Journalists from Washington, D.C.
Living people
Sportswriters from Illinois
People from Bethesda, Maryland
People from Chicago
Year of birth missing (living people)